The Communist Bulletin Group was a small left communist organisation based in Scotland.  It was founded in 1981 by groups in Edinburgh and Aberdeen which split from World Revolution (WR).  Many of its founders had originally been members of the Communist Workers Organisation but had left to join WR in 1977.

The split from WR was bitter, and WR accused the Communist Bulletin Group of theft.  The Communist Bulletin Group denied this, and published several harsh criticisms of WR and its international organisation, the International Communist Current.  In return, WR accused the Group of "parasitism".

They participated in a conference organised on 1 July 1989 by the Manchester group Subversion. They published a conference paper defending the idea of decadence arguing that the capitalist “beast” had been on a life support system since 1914.

In the early 1990s, the Communist Bulletin Group began co-operating with the Communist Workers Organisation, and contributed to its paper, Workers' Voice.  However, this came to an end in 1993 when the Communist Bulletin Group disbanded.

References 

Reply to the CWO: A rudderless policy of regroupment
Decantation of the PPM and the Oscillations of the IBRP
"Open Letter to the International Communist Current"
Communist Bulletin

International Communist Current
Defunct political parties in Scotland
Left communism
Political parties established in 1981
Political parties disestablished in 1993
Defunct communist parties in the United Kingdom